Bynum Independent School District is a public school district based in Bynum, Texas (USA).

Located in Hill County, a small portion of the district extends into Navarro County. Notable unincorporated communities in the district include Brandon and Irene.

The district has one school Bynum High School that serves students in grades pre-kindergarten through twelve.

Academic achievement
In 2009, the school district was rated "academically acceptable" by the Texas Education Agency.

Special programs

Athletics
Bynum High School plays six-man football.

See also

List of school districts in Texas

References

External links
Bynum ISD

School districts in Hill County, Texas
School districts in Navarro County, Texas